Tettamanti is an Italian surname. Notable people with the surname include:

Ferdinando Carabba Tettamanti (born 1944), Italian lawyer
Raúl Tettamanti (born 1956), Argentine rower
Tito Tettamanti (born 1930), Swiss lawyer, politician, and entrepreneur

Italian-language surnames